The 1864 United States presidential election in Missouri took place on November 8, 1864, as part of the 1864 United States presidential election. Voters chose 11 representatives, or electors, to the Electoral College, who voted for president and vice president.

Missouri was won by the incumbent President Abraham Lincoln (R-Illinois), running with former Senator and Military Governor of Tennessee Andrew Johnson, with 69.72% of the popular vote, against the 4th Commanding General of the United States Army George B. McClellan (D–New Jersey), running with Representative George H. Pendleton, with 30.28% of the vote.

Despite the fact that slavery and state's rights were popular in Missouri, the state gave Lincoln his fourth best result for popular vote percentage points after neighboring Kansas, Vermont and Massachusetts. The state was also his tenth highest for total votes.

Results

See also
 United States presidential elections in Missouri

References

Missouri
1864
1864 Missouri elections